The Miyako Stakes (Japanese みやこステークス) is a Grade 3 horse race for Thoroughbreds aged three and over, run in November over a distance of 1800 metres on dirt at Kyoto Racecourse.

The race was originally named the Topaz Stakes and was promoted to Grade 3 status in 2009. It was renamed the Miyako Stakes in the following year. The race serves as a trial for the Champions Cup.

Winners since 2009

See also
 Horse racing in Japan
 List of Japanese flat horse races

References

Dirt races in Japan